The Boy Next Door is a 2015 American erotic thriller film directed by Rob Cohen and written by Barbara Curry. The film stars Jennifer Lopez, Ryan Guzman, and Ian Nelson, with John Corbett and Kristin Chenoweth playing supporting roles. The film follows a 19-year-old man who, after having a one-night stand with his high school teacher, develops a dangerous and deranged obsession with her.

Barbara Curry, a former criminal lawyer, wrote the screenplay for the film inspired from her life's experiences. Blumhouse Productions financed and produced the film, which was filmed for 23 days in Los Angeles and other locations in California at the end of 2013.

The film was released in the United States on January 23, 2015, by Universal Pictures. The Boy Next Door received generally negative reviews from film critics, who felt that it promised "campy thrills" but did not deliver, however the film grossed $53.4 million against a $4 million budget making it a box office success. It was released on Blu-ray and DVD on April 28, 2015.

Plot 

Claire Peterson separates from her husband Garrett, after he was caught cheating with his secretary, while her colleague and best friend Vicky Lansing urges Claire to divorce. 19-year-old Noah Sandborn, an orphan whose parents died in a car accident a year prior, moves in next door to help his uncle, who uses a wheelchair. Noah befriends Kevin, Claire's teenage son, and begins attending his school, where Claire teaches Classics. Noah is drawn to Claire by their mutual love for Homer's Iliad. While Kevin and Garrett go away on a fishing trip, Claire goes on a miserable double date with Vicky, her boyfriend Ethan, and his ill-mannered friend Benny. She later has dinner with Noah, during which, despite Claire's initial resistance, they share a night of passionate sex together. The following morning, Claire wakes up and tells Noah that she regrets their night together, causing him to punch a wall in rage.

The school year begins, with Noah joining Claire's class after hacking into her computer, making it appear as if she had requested this. While continuing to hang out with Kevin, Noah manipulates him into hating his father. Later, Kevin overexerts himself at gym class and goes into shock; Noah saves his life by injecting him with Kevin's EpiPen. Claire receives flowers from Noah, and she confronts him about it, before later spending a night at home with Garrett, which Noah witnesses, having flashbacks of him and Claire having sex and escalating his obsession with her. After an incident where Noah — in defense of Kevin — slams a bully's head into a locker repeatedly, Vicky, who is vice principal at the school, discovers that Noah was kicked out of his previous school for disorderly conduct, and expels him after Noah insults her. Kevin prepares himself for his date with Allie at the fall fling, where Claire goes to investigate a leak in the boys' bathroom, where she sees the words "I fucked Claire Peterson" written on the wall before Noah emerges. He attempts to rape her, but she fends him off and demands that he stay away from her and Kevin, but Noah is unwilling to do so, under the delusional belief that Claire is willing to be with him. 

The following day, Noah leaves a printer running in Claire's classroom, with pictures of them sleeping together scattered everywhere. Later, when Garrett's car brakes fail to work, he and Kevin are nearly involved in an accident. That evening, Noah attempts to blackmail Claire, telling her that he has a video of them having sex, which he will relinquish to her if she continues sleeping with him. She refuses, and has Vicky lure Noah away from his house so she can break in and delete their sex tape. While there, she finds nude pictures of herself all over the walls and on his laptop; she also finds instructions on how to tamper with the brakes of Garrett's car and Noah's parents' car. With the help of Ethan's detective friend, she learns the truth about the car accident in Noah's family. Noah binds and gags Vicky with duct tape and uses a recording of her voice to lure Claire to her house. 

When Claire arrives, she discovers Vicky dead, and as a horrified Claire contacts the police, she runs into Noah again. She accuses him of killing his parents, and he clarifies that his mother killed herself after his father cheated on her and he retaliated by cutting the brakes of his father's car, killing him and his mistress. Noah takes Claire to a barn house where he has tied up Garrett and Kevin, outlining his deluded notion that killing them will help him and Claire to start a new life together, and soon pours kerosene around the barn, causing it to ignite in flames. In the ensuing struggle, Claire finally destroys Noah's delusional love for her by stabbing his eye with Kevin's EpiPen. An enraged Noah attempts to kill all three, but Claire eventually pulls a lever that drops an engine on Noah, ultimately killing him. Claire and Kevin then help a wounded Garrett out of the burning barn house as police and paramedics arrive.

Cast 
 Jennifer Lopez as Claire Peterson
 Ryan Guzman as Noah Sandborn
 Ian Nelson as Kevin Peterson
 John Corbett as Garrett Peterson
 Kristin Chenoweth as Vicky Lansing
 Lexi Atkins as Allie Callahan
 Hill Harper as Principal Edward Warren
 Travis Schuldt as Ethan
 Brian Mahoney as Cooper
 Adam Hicks as Jason Zimmer
 François Chau as Detective Johnny Chou
 Bailey Chase as Benny

Production

Conception and writing 
Screenwriter Barbara Curry, who was a criminal lawyer for ten years, revealed that she created the script's original concept after running past a house which she described as her "dream house". A "bad boy" her son went to school with resided in the house across the street, which gave her a "really interesting" concept about a neighborhood boy creating conflict and "driving a wedge between a family". This served as her inspiration for the screenplay.

Curry stated that the "first few drafts of [the movie] focused on a 12-year-old boy and a mother's trial of trying to get her son out of this boy's clutches, and gradually, it became something else". In the original script, Claire was "happily married", but Curry chose to have her separated due to her husband's infidelity, so that she could be a "more sympathetic character". Curry was influenced by the real-life story of Mary Kay Letourneau, a teacher who became involved with her underage student, causing her to be convicted for rape charges. Director Rob Cohen revealed that in Curry's draft, the character of Noah was younger, but he made the conscious decision to age him to 19, because he felt as if it was "not healthy" and that audiences would lose sympathy for the protagonist. Explaining her character, Lopez stated that Claire was feeling "worthless" after her husband cheated, and "People can understand that. They can understand making a mistake in a moment like that."

The Boy Next Doors plot has been compared to the thriller films Basic Instinct (1992) and Swimfan (2002), while being dubbed "the Fatal Attraction of 2015". The formerly dominant erotic thriller genre had been fading from Hollywood features since the 1990s. Director Rob Cohen stated that with the film, he wanted to "reinvent the genre in an entertaining way" that would reflect "2015, not 1990".

Pre-production 
Casting of The Boy Next Door began early September 2013, when Jennifer Lopez was chosen to play Claire. Kristin Chenoweth was later cast in the film as Lopez's character's friend. In October 2013, John Corbett and Ryan Guzman were cast in the film, with Corbett playing Lopez's ex-husband and Guzman playing the titular role. After an audition, newcomer Lexi Atkins was also cast in the film for a small role.

Lopez, who also served as producer on the film, chose a fellow Latino actor Guzman to cast in the film, stating that "two Latinos opening in a mainstream movie, if it does well, that's gonna change things. I would love for the Latino community to come out and support this movie because it would give us the freedom." She also stated that "We [Latinos] don't have to be close-minded, where two Latinos have to be speaking Spanish or they have to have some Latin reference in the movie... That's what I love about this film. We're breaking down the walls and stereotypes."

Filming 

On his approach, Cohen said that he refused to consider making the film PG-13: "The first thing I said was, 'If you want me, I'm making an R-rated movie. I don't want to deal with sex and make it, like, for 13-year-olds.' The film took 23 days to shoot. Discussing its micro-budget, Lopez stated: "You know what, we put all four million dollars in front of the camera! We all shared one trailer, we had no craft service, it wasn't that type of luxury movie set, let's say." She also found that the limited budget and filming period was "super intense", saying: "I never had done a film like that in my career. That was the first time we did that, but it was very liberating as an artist because it made me realize I can make whatever movie I want like this." On filming sex scenes, Guzman said "that was the time in the film when I was the most uncomfortable. We had to choreograph every piece... It was the most unsexy-really-sexy scene that you'll see on screen." Filming took place throughout fall 2013 in Los Angeles. In December 2013, the film received permit to shoot in Placerita Canyon, Newhall. Some of the remaining scenes were also filmed in April 2014.

Release 
The film's main demographic is women and Latinos. Lopez made her largest Hispanic press tour to date in Miami in promotion of The Boy Next Door. She hoped that the film would appeal to Hispanic markets, due to featuring two Hispanic leads, which she stated might not have been possible if a big studio had produced it. She visited ¡Despierta América! and Nuestra Belleza Latina, shows which air on the Latin American network Univision, the latter of which saw 22% ratings gain with Lopez's appearance. According to Variety, the film received 105,000 posts on Twitter by the day of its release. Measuring the film's pros and cons, Boxoffice magazine said that the film's social media activity online and Lopez's pull with Latino audiences would help it. However, the publication said that Lopez's box office drawing power had been dwindling, which worked against the film.

The film was released on January 23, 2015. It runs for approximately 90 minutes and was given an R rating from the MPAA for "violence, sexual content/nudity, and language". A BBFC classification, dated February 9, 2015, gives the film a 15 certificate for "strong violence, threat, very strong language". The film's UK distributors, also Universal Studios, chose to remove two seconds of material, the eye gouging scene, in order to obtain a 15. There is an 18-rated version available.

The Boy Next Door was released on Blu-ray and DVD on April 28, 2015. It has earned $7.2 million from domestic home video sales.

Reception

Box office 
Opening across 2,602 North American theaters, The Boy Next Door was projected to pull in $12–15 million over its opening weekend. The film earned $5.7 million on its opening day, surpassing its budget. It opened at number two at the US box office, with an opening weekend gross of $14.9 million, finishing as the top new release for that week. The Hollywood Reporter revealed that 45 percent of the film's opening week audience was Hispanic, while 71 percent of the overall audience was female. The film became Lopez's best opening weekend for a January release, beating her romantic comedy The Wedding Planner (2001) which opened with $13.5 million. It was also her best opening weekend for a thriller film, ahead of Angel Eyes (2001, $9.2 million), Enough (2002, $14 million), and Parker (2013, $7 million). Furthermore, it is Lopez's biggest live-action opening since 2005's Monster-in-Law. The Boy Next Door ended its domestic box office run with a total of $36.0 million, and has earned another $17.4 million in foreign markets, making a total of $53 million.

Critical response 
The Boy Next Door received generally negative reviews from film critics, who felt that it promised "campy thrills" but did not deliver. On Rotten Tomatoes, the film holds a rating of 12%, based on 136 reviews, with a rating average of 3.40/10. The site's consensus reads: "The Boy Next Door may get a few howls out of fans of stalker thrillers, but for most  viewers, it won't even rise to 'so bad it's good' status." On Metacritic, the film has a score of 30 out of 100, based on 33 critics, indicating "generally unfavorable reviews". Audiences polled by CinemaScore, during the opening weekend, gave the film a grade of "B−" on an A+ to F scale.

Writing for the San Francisco Chronicle, Thomas Lee wrote: "Why  Lopez decided to do this inept, cliche-infested film is anyone's guess". Peter Keough of The Boston Globe wrote that "[the film] may end up as one of the worst movies of 2015, but it is also one of the most entertaining". The Guardian writer Jordan Hoffman gave the film two stars, writing that "it is bad, but it isn't THAT bad", and said: "for a would-be cult  classic, this could have been much more". Robert Abele of the Los Angeles Times was critical of  The Boy Next Door, calling it "breathless, uninspired (...) junk that feels like the iffiest bits of a Lifetime movie and late-night cable schlock slapped together", calling Guzman's character boring. Entertainment Weeklys Leah Greenblatt similarly wrote that the film was a "few deliciously bonkers bons mots dot the Lifetime-grade dialogue", while calling its script "too timid to fully dive into the high camp it hints at". Despite negative reviews, Lopez has received praise. Richard Lawson from Vanity Fair wrote: "Given the material, Lopez is actually pretty darn good in  the movie, taking it seriously enough that it's not irksomely arch camp, but also plenty aware that she's not doing Shakespeare. She's a joy to watch throughout." Claudia Puig from USA Today stated that the movie was an improvement on her previous romantic comedies, calling Lopez "believably powerful in moments of physical conflict". Although he called the film "clunky and ridiculous", Daniel D'Addario from Time but said it is "a rare movie about women" and "the Bad Movie Hollywood Needs Right Now". D'Addario added that the film feels "perversely refreshing" for its focus on women's issues.

Several publications particularly criticized the scene where Noah gives Claire a printed book that is supposed to be a first edition copy of the  Iliad, a work written nearly 3,000 years ago in modern Greece. Amy Heidt, writing for Slate, noted that while a first English edition could have been a possible explanation, such works were from the 16th and 17th centuries, and describes the book Noah gives Claire as "A pristine hardcover that looks like those Jane Austen Penguin Classics they sell at Urban Outfitters." Following the film's release, the term "The Iliad, first edition" became the top search term on the online book marketplace AbeBooks. Richard Davis, a spokesman for the website, said: "It appears people who have watched the film are trying to identify the actual edition handed to Lopez, which has dark yellow and blue boards. I cannot match the book seen in the movie to anything currently for sale on AbeBooks."

Accolades 
The film earned Lopez an MTV Movie Award nomination and win for Best Scared-As-Shit Performance at the 2015 MTV Movie Awards. Lopez later received two more accolades for her work as an actress and as a producer in film at the Premios Juventud, broadcast by Univision. Lopez earned a People's Choice Award nomination for Favorite Dramatic Movie Actress, the movie was nominated for Favorite Thriller Movie. The movie received one Golden Raspberry Award nomination for Lopez in the Worst Actress category.

References

External links 
 
 

2010s erotic thriller films
2015 horror thriller films
2010s psychological horror films
2015 psychological thriller films
2010s romantic thriller films
2015 films
2015 horror films
Adultery in films
American erotic thriller films
American horror thriller films
American romantic thriller films
Blumhouse Productions films
2010s English-language films
American erotic romance films
Films about murderers
Films about stalking
Films about scandalous teacher–student relationships
Films directed by Rob Cohen
Films produced by Jason Blum
Films scored by Randy Edelman
Films scored by Nathan Barr
Films shot in Los Angeles County, California
Films shot in Los Angeles
American horror drama films
Nuyorican Productions films
Patricide in fiction
American romantic horror films
Universal Pictures films
2010s American films